The Church of the Intercession of the Theotokos in Samarovo (Покровская церковь) is a Siberian Baroque church in Khanty-Mansiysk. It belongs to the Tobolsk and Tyumen Diocese of the Russian Orthodox Church.

The church is situated in the former village of Samarovo. The main altar is consecrated in honour of the Feast of the Intercession of the Theotokos; the southern altar is consecrated in honour of the Abalak icon of the Theotokos (also known as Our Lady of the Sign); the northern altar is consecrated in honour of Saint Nicholas.

History 

The exact date the original church was built is unknown. It is known from the Kungur Chronicles, that in 1582 Cossack Yermak, having spent 3 days in strict fasting and prayer, and trusting in God’s help, utterly defeated Khan Kuchum’s army under Tobolsk, although the latter’s army more than 10 times outnumbered Cossacks’ forces.

Most likely it was the Cossacks, who built the first wooden church in honour of Saint Nikolas the Miracle-Worker. In 1651 Chrisanf M. Loparev wrote: “…Samarovsky yam was, of course, very small at that time, but there was a wooden church in the name of Saint Nikolas the Miracle-Worker, the Patron of all travellers by water”. It is necessary to mention, that in 1712-1714 schema monk Saint Filofey Leshchinsky, metropolitan of Tobolsk passed through the village of Samarovo in the summer time during his missionary journeys over the Yugra-land, destroying heathen temples, baptizing Ostyaks and Voguls, building new Orthodox churches and temples. It’s quite possible, that it was Filofey, who built the church of the Intercession of the Most Holy Theotokos in Samarovo .
In 1808 the inhabitants of Samarovo village collected money and wrote a petition to Tobolsk, asking to build a new stone church in their village. The building of the church was erected by architect Shangin towards 1815.

During the years of Soviet power the church was plundered. The walls of the church were disassembled, a fish-processing factory was built out of them, and a fisherman’s club was built on the place, where the church had stood. However, hardly half a century passed, when the club was demolished, a new club was built in another place, and a vacant lot was on the place of the old club.
In 1994 excavations were organized and the foundation of the church was discovered. On the Feast of Nativity of the Most Holy Theotokos on September the 21st in 1996 priest Sergiy Kravtsov held a public prayer and works on restoration of the church of the Intercession of the Most Holy Theotokos started. In 2001 the church was consecrated and Patriarch of Moscow and All Russia, Alexy II of Moscow, visited it the same year.

Khanty-Mansiysk
Churches completed in 1816
Russian Orthodox church buildings in Russia
19th-century Eastern Orthodox church buildings